Thennamanadu North is a village in the Orathanadu taluk of Thanjavur district, Tamil Nadu, India.

Demographics 

As per the 2001 census, Thennamanadu North had a total population of 1354 with 625 males and 729 females. The sex ratio was 1166. The literacy rate was 65.1.

References 

 

Villages in Thanjavur district